Pas Chat Sharang Rang (also Romanized as Pas Chāt Sharāng Rang) is a village in Margown Rural District, Margown District, Boyer-Ahmad County, Kohgiluyeh and Boyer-Ahmad Province, Iran. At the 2006 census, its population was 24, in 6 families.

References 

Populated places in Boyer-Ahmad County